Activity Streams is an open format specification for activity stream protocols, which are used to syndicate activities taken in social web applications and services, similar to those in Facebook's, Instagram's, and Twitter's.

The standard provides a general way to represent activities. For instance "Jack added Hawaii to his list of places to visit". Would be represented as actor:jack, verb:add, object:Hawaii, target:placestovisit.

Implementors of the activity Activity Streams draft include Gnip, Stream, Stream Framework, and Pump.io.

The largest open source library (based on watchers) is Stream Framework, the authors of Stream Framework also run getstream.io. In addition there is a trend of SOA (service-oriented architecture) where third parties power this type of functionality.

Example 
{
  "@context": "https://www.w3.org/ns/activitystreams",
  "summary": "A note",
  "type": "Note",
  "content": "My dog has fleas."
}

See also 
 ActivityPub

References

External links 
 
 Activity Streams 2.0 , W3C recommendation 23 May 2017

Atom (Web standard)